"Underdogs" is a song by Welsh alternative rock band Manic Street Preachers. It was released in 2007 by record label Columbia as the first single taken from their eighth studio album, Send Away the Tigers.

Fan competition 

A fan competition was announced at the time of the song's announcement, asking fans to send in photos, videos and other visual media they thought fit the song and its theme. The final video, composed of clips from the band's previous videos and fan-sent material, was released on the band's website on 12 April 2007.

Release 

"Underdogs" was released on 19 March 2007 by record label Columbia as the first single taken from their eighth studio album, Send Away the Tigers. It was released on one-sided 7" vinyl – limited to 1,000 copies, and which sold out instantly on pre-order– and also as a digital download. A promo CD version in card sleeve also exists but is considered rare.

Content 
"Underdogs" was proclaimed by the NME to be a "glam-metal riot". Bassist Nicky Wire called "Underdogs" an "all out punk metal" song, and likened the track's outro style to that of Alice Cooper and The Stooges.

References

External links 
 Official download

Manic Street Preachers songs
2007 singles
Song recordings produced by Dave Eringa
Columbia Records singles
Songs written by James Dean Bradfield
Songs written by Nicky Wire
Songs written by Sean Moore (musician)
2007 songs